The 2011 Miami Beach mayoral election, a nonpartisan race, was held on Tuesday, November 1, 2011. Incumbent Mayor Matti Herrera Bower, who was first elected in 2007, won a third and final two-year term. She was challenged by three opponents.

Candidates
Matti Herrera Bower, age 72 - incumbent Mayor of Miami Beach since 2007. (Democratic Party)
Steve Berke, age 30 - Comedian and entrepreneur. (After Party)
Dave Crystal, age 34 - Entrepreneur (Republican Party)
Laura Rivero Levey, age 46 - Public relations professional (Republican Party)

General election

References

2011 Florida elections
2011 United States mayoral elections
2011